The Trofeo Ciudad de Alicante (ENG:Alicante City Trophy) is a friendly football tournament played annually since 1984, with the exception of the years 1997, 1999 and 2003–2009. It's held in Alicante, Valencian Community, Spain by Hércules CF.

History of winners

Titles by club

References
General

Specific

Spanish football friendly trophies
Hércules CF
1984 establishments in Spain